Neoromicia grandidieri, known by the common names of Dobson's pipistrelle and yellow pipistrelle, is a species of vesper bat found in Africa. It was formerly in the genus Pipistrellus

Taxonomy
Neoromicia grandidieri was described as a new species in 1876 by Irish zoologist George Edward Dobson, who placed it in the now-defunct genus Vesperugo. Its scientific name was Vesperugo (Vesperus) grandidieri. The eponym for the species name "grandidieri " was Alfred Grandidier, a French naturalist who collected the holotype from Zanzibar. Some consider Neoromicia grandidieri to have two subspecies: the nominate subspecies (N. g. grandidieri) and N. g. angolensis. It is the only member of the Afropipistrellus subgenus.

Description
It is considered a very small microbat. It has blackish-brown wing membranes, pale brown fur, and brown ears.

Range and habitat
N. g. grandidieri occurs in East Africa, while P. g. angolensis occurs in Angola, Malawi, and Cameroon.

References

Taxa named by George Edward Dobson
Mammals described in 1876
Bats of Africa
Taxobox binomials not recognized by IUCN